Cedar Point is a census-designated place (CDP) in Polk County, Texas, United States. This was a new CDP for the 2010 census with a population of 630.

Geography
Cedar Point is located at  (30.797535, -95.074909).

References

Census-designated places in Polk County, Texas
Census-designated places in Texas